Aphysoneura is a genus of butterflies from the subfamily Satyrinae in the family Nymphalidae.

Species
Aphysoneura pigmentaria Karsch, 1894 – painted ringlet
Aphysoneura scapulifascia Joicey & Talbot, 1922

External links 
"Aphysoneura Karsch, 1894" at Markku Savela's Lepidoptera and Some Other Life Forms
Seitz, A. Die Gross-Schmetterlinge der Erde 13: Die Afrikanischen Tagfalter. Plate XIII 28

Melanitini
Butterfly genera
Taxa named by Ferdinand Karsch